The Common may refer to:

Places
 The Common, Brinkworth, England
 The Common, Broughton Gifford, England
The Common, Queensland, suburb of Rockhampton, Australia
 The Common, Suffolk, England, in Little Blakenham parish
The Common, Winterslow, England
 The Common, a nickname of such places as the:
 Boston Common
Cambridge Common
The Commonwealth of Massachusetts

Periodicals
 The Common (magazine), Amherst, Massachusetts

See also
 Common (disambiguation)
Common law (disambiguation)
 Commons (disambiguation)
Commonwealth (disambiguation)
 Comyn (disambiguation)